Nam quốc sơn hà is a famous 10th- to 11th-century Vietnamese patriotic poem. Dubbed "Vietnam's first Declaration of Independence", it asserts the sovereignty of Vietnam's rulers over its lands. The poem was first dictated to be read aloud before and during battles to boost army morale and nationalism when Vietnam under Lê Đại Hành and Lý Thường Kiệt fought against two invasions by Song dynasty in 981 and 1075–1076 and would become became an emblematic hymn in the early independence wars.

The poem's authorship its exact authorship is still controversial and it's written in the form of an oracle, the poem is one of the best-known pieces of Vietnamese literature. More recently, this same poem has often been recited to show anti-Chinese sentiment by Vietnamese citizens when China began oil exploration in historically Vietnamese marine areas.

981 version
This version is included in Lĩnh Nam chích quái ("Selection of Strange Tales from Lingnan") and dated to the Song–Đại Cồ Việt war:

1076 version
This version is included in Đại Việt sử ký toàn thư ("Complete Historical Annals of Great Viet") and dated to the Song–Đại Việt war:

See also
 Song–Đại Cồ Việt war
 Song–Đại Việt War
 Vietnamese Declarations of Independence
 Hịch tướng sĩ, a 13th-century hymn by Trần Hưng Đạo while fighting against the Mongol invasions.

Notes

References

External links
 Lý Thường Kiệt với bài thơ "Nam quốc sơn hà"

Declarations of independence of Vietnam
Vietnamese poems
Spoken word
Lý dynasty literature
11th century in Vietnam
11th-century poems